The 2021 IIHF Women's World Championship Division III was scheduled to be an international ice hockey tournament organised by the International Ice Hockey Federation. The tournament would have been held in Kaunas, Lithuania, from 15 to 21 March 2021.

The tournament was cancelled on 18 November 2020 due to the COVID-19 pandemic.

Participants

Standings

References

External links
Official website of IIHF

2021
Division III
2021 IIHF Women's World Championship Division III
Sports competitions in Kaunas
2021 in Lithuanian sport
IIHF Women's World Championship Division III
IIHF Women's World Championship Division III, 2021